The 2019 Georgia Bulldogs baseball team represented the University of Georgia in the 2019 NCAA Division I baseball season. The Bulldogs played their home games at Foley Field.

Preseason

Preseason All-American teams

3rd Team
Aaron Schunk – Utility Player (Baseball America)

SEC media poll
The SEC media poll was released on February 7, 2019 with the Bulldogs predicted to finish in third place in the Eastern Division.

Preseason All-SEC teams

1st Team
Aaron Schunk – Third Baseman

2nd Team
Mason Meadows – Catcher
LJ Talley – Second Baseman
Aaron Schunk – Designated Hitter/Utility

Roster

Schedule and results

Schedule Source:
*Rankings are based on the team's current ranking in the D1Baseball poll.

Athens Regional

Record vs. conference opponents

Rankings

2019 MLB draft

References

Georgia
Georgia Bulldogs baseball seasons
Georgia Bulldogs baseball
Georgia